The Interfaith Drug Policy Initiative, or IDPI, is a Washington, DC, area based non-profit organization that works to organize religious leaders around drug policy reform based on principles of compassion, morality, and community involvement.

Issues
IDPI focuses its federal work on three main issues:

 Repealing mandatory minimum drug sentencing and publicizing cases like Hamedah Hasan’s.
 Changing federal law to allow for the use of medical marijuana.
 Restoring financial aid to college students who have lost it because of a drug conviction. (Higher Education Act of 1965)

IDPI also works on individual state issues such as promoting ballot initiatives and facilitating educational campaigns like Law Enforcement Against Prohibition.

History
IDPI was founded in November 2003 by Marijuana Policy Project co-founder Charles (Chuck) Thomas, who is the current executive director.

Mission statement
“The purpose for which this non-profit corporation is formed is to organize people of faith to promote drug policy reform; i.e., moving from prohibition laws toward reasonable and compassionate drug regulation, education and treatment.”

External links
Interfaith Drug Policy Initiative Website
Texan Addiction Treatments Information

Drug rehabilitation
Non-profit organizations based in Washington, D.C.